Duluth Public Schools is a school district based in Duluth, Minnesota. It is also known as Independent School District (ISD) #709.

Schools

High schools
 Denfeld High School
 Duluth East High School

Middle schools
 Lincoln Park Middle School
 Ordean East Middle School

Elementary schools
 Congdon Park Elementary School
 Homecroft Elementary School
 Lakewood Elementary School
 Laura MacArthur Elementary School
 Lester Park Elementary School
 Lowell Elementary School
 Myers–Wilkins Elementary School
 Piedmont Elementary School
 Stowe Elementary School

References

External links
 

School districts in Minnesota
Education in Duluth, Minnesota